Barenda is a village in Hilauli block of Unnao district, Uttar Pradesh, India. As of 2011, its population is 864, in 174 households, and it has 2 primary schools and no healthcare facilities.

The 1961 census recorded Barenda as comprising 4 hamlets, with a total population of 245 (125 male and 120 female), in 60 households and 58 physical houses. The area of the village was given as 464 acres.

References

Villages in Unnao district